The following is a timeline of the history of the city of Chicago, Illinois, United States.

Prior to 19th century

 

 1673: French-Canadian explorers Jacques Marquette and Louis Jolliet, on their way to Québec, pass through the area that will become Chicago.
 1677: Father Claude Allouez arrived to try to convert the natives to Christianity
 1682: French explorer René Robert Cavelier, Sieur de la Salle, passes through Chicago en route to the mouth of the Mississippi River.
 1696: Jesuit missionary Francois Pinet founds the Mission of the Guardian Angel. It is abandoned four years later.
 1705: Conflicts develop between French traders and the Fox tribe of Native Americans.
 1719: The Comanche Indian Tribe settle in the Great Plains and in the Midwest of the United States.
 1754: The Illinois Country becomes part of New France, days later The French and Indian War begins with the war against the British.
 1763: The Illinois Country falls to British Troops after the defeat of New France.
 1775: The Revolutionary War begins with America declaring independence from Britain.
 1778: The Illinois Campaign is born under the command of George Rogers Clark to lead the fight against major British outposts scattered across the country.
 1780s: Jean Baptiste Point du Sable establishes Chicago's first permanent settlement near the mouth of the Chicago River.
 1795: Six square miles (16 km2) of land at the mouth of the Chicago River are reserved by the Treaty of Greenville for use by the United States.
 1796: Kittahawa, du Sable's Potawatomi Indian wife, delivers Eulalia Point du Sable, Chicago's first recorded birth.

19th century

1800s-1840s
 1803: The United States Army orders the construction of Fort Dearborn by Major John Whistler. It is built near the mouth of the Chicago River.
 1812
 June 17, Jean La Lime is killed by John Kinzie, making him the first recorded murder victim in Chicago.
 August 15, the Battle of Fort Dearborn.
 1816: The Treaty of St. Louis is signed in St. Louis, Missouri. Ft. Dearborn is rebuilt.
 1818: December 3, Illinois joins the Union and becomes a state.

 1830
 August 4, Chicago is surveyed and platted for the first time by James Thompson.
 Population: "Less than 100".
 1833: Chicago incorporated as a town.
 1837
 Chicago incorporated as a city.
C.D. Peacock jewelers was founded. It is the oldest Chicago business still operating today.
 Chicago receives its first charter.
Rush Medical College is founded two days before the city was chartered. It is the first medical school in the state of Illinois which is still operating.
 1840
 July 10, Chicago's first legally executed criminal, John Stone was hanged for rape and murder.
 Population: 4,470.
 1844: Lake Park designated.
 1847: June 10, The first issue of the Chicago Tribune is published.
 1848
 Chicago Board of Trade opens on April 3 by 82 local businessmen.
 Illinois and Michigan Canal opens and traffic begins moving faster.
 Galena and Chicago Union Railroad enters operation becoming the first railroad in Chicago
 1849
Wauconda is founded.

1850s-1890s
 1850: Population: 29,963.
 1851: Chicago's first institution of higher education, Northwestern University, is founded.
 1852: Mercy Hospital becomes the first hospital in Illinois.
 1853
 October: State Convention of the Colored Citizens held in city.
 Union Park named.
 1854: A cholera epidemic took the lives of 5.5% of the population of Chicago.
 1855
 Chicago Theological Seminary founded.
 April 21, Lager Beer Riot.
 Population: 80,000.
 1856: Chicago Historical Society founded.
 1857
 Iwan Ries & Co. Chicago's oldest family-owned business opens, still in operation today, the oldest family-owned tobacco shop.
 Mathias A. Klein & Sons (Klein Tools Inc.), still family owned and run today by fifth and sixth generation Klein's.
 Cook County Hospital opens.
 Hyde Park House built.
 1859: McCormick Theological Seminary relocated.
 1860
 September 8, the Lady Elgin Disaster.
 Population: 112,172.
 Daprato Statuary Company (Currently Daprato Rigali Studios) founded by the Daprato brothers, Italian immigrants from Barga.
 1865
 Corporal punishment was abandoned in schools.
 Population: 178,492.
 1866: School of the Art Institute of Chicago founded.
 1867
 Construction began on the Water Tower designed by architect W. W. Boyington.
 Chicago Academy of Music founded.
 1868
 Rand McNally is formed as a railway guide company.
 Lincoln Park Zoo founded.
 1869
 Chicago Water Tower built.
 The first Illinois woman suffrage convention was held in Chicago
 The Chicago Club is established.
 Washington Square Park being developed.
 1870
 St. Ignatius College founded, later Loyola University
 Population: 298,977.
 1871: October 8–October 10, the Great Chicago Fire.
 1872
Montgomery Ward in business.
Establishment of the first Black fire company in the city.

 1873: Chicago Public Library established.
 1875: Holy Name Cathedral dedicated.
 1877: Railroad strike.

 1878
 Art Institute of Chicago established.
 Conservator newspaper begins publication.
 1879: Art Institute of Chicago founded.
 1880: Polish National Alliance headquartered in city.
 1881: Unsightly beggar ordinance effected.

 1885: Home Insurance Building building was the first skyscraper that stood in Chicago from 1885 to 1931. It was the first tall building to be supported both inside and outside by a fireproof structural steel frame, though it also included reinforced concrete. A landmark lost to history and is considered the world's first skyscraper.

 1886
 May 4, the Haymarket Riot.
 Chicago Evening Post published (until 1932).
 1887: Newberry Library established.
 1888: Dearborn Observatory rebuilt.
 1889
 Hull House founded. 
 Auditorium Building completed.
 Auditorium Theatre opened.
 1890: The University of Chicago is founded by John D. Rockefeller.
 1891
 Chicago Symphony Orchestra founded by Theodore Thomas.
 Provident Hospital founded.
 1892
 June 6, The Chicago and South Side Rapid Transit Railroad, Chicago's first 'L' line, went into operation.
 Masonic Temple for two years, the tallest building in Chicago.
 Streetcar tunnels in Chicago (under the Chicago River) in use until 1906.
 1893
 May 1–October 30, The World's Columbian Exposition (World's Fair); World's Parliament of Religions held.
 October 28, Mayor Carter Harrison, Sr. was assassinated by Patrick Eugene Prendergast.
 Sears, Roebuck and Company in business.
 First Ferris wheel built by George Washington Gale Ferris Jr.
 Art Institute of Chicago building opens.
 Monadnock Building completed.
 Universal Peace Congress held.
 Chicago Civic Federation founded.
 1894
 May 11–August 2, the Pullman Strike.
 Ženské Listy women's magazine begins publication.
 Field Museum of Natural History established.
 1895: Marquette Building completed.
 1896
 1896 Democratic National Convention held; Bryan delivers Cross of Gold speech.
 Campaign "to improve municipal service and politics" begun in 1896.
 Abeny beauty shop and Tonnesen Sisters photo studio in business.
 1897
 March 12, The Chicago Elevator Protective Association of Chicago was formed. Later, on July 15, 1901 to become the International Union of Elevator Constructors Local 2.
 The Union Loop Elevated is completed.
 National union of meat packers formed. 
 1898: National peace jubilee was held.
 1899
 Cook County juvenile court established.
 Municipal Art League established.
 Carson, Pirie, Scott and Company Building constructed.

 1900
 Chicago Sanitary and Ship Canal opens; the Chicago River is completely reversed.
 Municipal Reference Library active (approximate date).
 Labor strike of machinists.
 Population: 1,698,575.

20th century

1900s-1940s

 1902: Meatpacking strike.
 1903
 December 30, Iroquois Theater Fire
 City Club of Chicago formed.
 1905
 The Industrial Workers of the World was founded in June
 Teamsters' strike.
 Chicago Defender newspaper begins publication.
 City Hall rebuilding completed.
 Chicago Federal Building completed.
 1906
 Municipal court established.
 The Chicago White Sox defeated the Chicago Cubs in the only all-Chicago World Series.
 Sinclair's fictional The Jungle published.
 Chicago Tunnel Company operated a 2ft. narrow-gauge railway freight tunnel network (until 1959).
 1907: Adolph Kroch opens a bookstore which will evolve into Kroch's and Brentano's
 1908
 The Chicago Cubs win the World Series for the second year in a row
 Binga Bank in business.
 1909: Burnham's Plan of Chicago presented.
 1910: Population: 2,185,283.
 1911: Chicago and North Western Railway Terminal completed.
 1913
 Great Lakes Storm of 1913
 Wabash Avenue YMCA opens.
 1914: Alpha Suffrage Club active.

 1915
 July 24, the SS Eastland Disaster.
 Chicago Municipal Tuberculosis Sanitarium founded.
 1916
 Rebuilding of the American Fort
 Navy Pier built. 
 1918 
Micheaux Film and Book Company in business.
The Spanish flu killed over 8,500 people in Chicago between September and November 1918.
 1919
 July 27, the Chicago race riot of 1919.
 Real estate broker Archibald Teller opened the first Fannie May candy store.
 1920: Population: 2,701,705.
 1921
 Balaban and Katz Chicago Theatre built, (later the Chicago Theatre).
 Field Museum of Natural History relocates to Chicago Park District.
 Street-widening and street-opening projects underway.
 Medill School of Journalism opens.
 1922: Chicago Council on Global Affairs established.
 1925
 Goodman Theatre established.
 Chicago railway station opened.
 The Tribune Tower was completed on Michigan Avenue. The building's large Gothic entrance contains pieces of stone from other famous buildings: Westminster Abbey, Cologne Cathedral, the Alamo, the Taj Mahal, the Great Pyramid, and the Arc de Triomphe.
 1926
 Nederlander Theatre opened.
 Granada Theatre opened.
 1927: Originally called the Chicago Municipal Airport, Chicago Midway International Airport opened. It was renamed in 1949 to honor the Battle of Midway in World War II. 
 1929
 February 14, the St. Valentine's Day Massacre.
 Oscar De Priest becomes U.S. representative for Illinois's 1st congressional district.
 Civic Opera Building & Civic Opera House opened.
 1930
 March 6: 50,000 gather for International Unemployment Day, capping 10 days of protest against Great Depression conditions.
 May 12, Adler Planetarium opened, through a gift from local merchant Max Adler. It was the first planetarium in the Western Hemisphere.
 April 6, Twinkies are in Invented in Schiller Park.
 May 30, Shedd Aquarium opens.
 The Merchandise Mart was built for Marshall Field & Co. The $32 million, 4.2 million square foot (390,000 m2) building was the world's largest commercial building. It was sold it to Joseph P. Kennedy in 1945.
 1933: March 6, Mayor Anton Cermak was killed while riding in a car with President-elect Roosevelt. The assassin was thought to have been aiming for Roosevelt.
 1933-34: Century of Progress World's Fair.
 1934
 July 22, John Dillinger was shot by the FBI in the alley next to the Biograph Theater.
 Brookfield Zoo opened.
 1935
 January 19, Coopers Inc. sells the world's first briefs.
 Jay Berwanger of the University of Chicago is awarded the very first Heisman Trophy
 1937: Labor strike of steelworkers.
 1938: Community Factbook begins publication.
 1944: Premiere of Williams' play The Glass Menagerie.
 1945: Ebony magazine begins publication.
 1946: Construction of Thatcher Homes begins.
 1948: Chicago Daily Sun and Times newspaper begins publication.

1950s-1990s
 1950: Chess Records in business.
 1954: Johnson Products Company in business.
 1955: The first McDonald's franchise restaurant, owned by Ray Kroc, opened in the suburb of Des Plaines.
 1958
 December 1, Our Lady of the Angels School Fire.
 The last streetcar ran in the city. At one time, Chicago had the largest streetcar system in the world.
 1959: Second City comedy troupe active.
 1960
 September 26: Nixon-Kennedy televised presidential debate held.
 The first of the Playboy Clubs, featuring bunnies, opened in Chicago.
 1963 - Donald Rumsfeld became U.S. representative for Illinois's 13th congressional district.
 1965-66 - The Chicago Freedom Movement, centering on the topic of open housing, paves the way for the 1968 Fair Housing Act.
 1967
 January 26–January 27, Major snowstorm deposits 23 inches of snow, closing the city for several days.
 August 1: maiden voyage of UAC TurboTrain.
 1968: 
 February 7: Mickelberry Sausage Company plant explosion kills nine and injured 70.
 August 26–August 29, 1968 Democratic National Convention and its accompanying anti-Vietnam War protests.
 1969 
 October: Weathermen's antiwar demonstration.
 December 4: Black Panther Fred Hampton assassinated.
 The Chicago 8 trial opens.
 The 100-floor John Hancock Center was built.
 1970
 Soul Train television program begins broadcasting.
 Casa Aztlán (organization) founded.
 1971: Segundo Ruiz Belvis Cultural Center founded.
 1972: Vietnam Veterans Against the War headquartered in Chicago.
 1973: Sears Tower, the tallest building in the world for the next 25 years, was completed.
 1974: Steppenwolf Theatre Company founded.
 1977: Chicago Marathon begins.
 1978: First BBS goes online on February 16.
 1979
 Heavy snowstorm and city's slow response lead to upset of incumbent mayor.
 May 25, the American Airlines Flight 191 crashes.
 Chicago's first female mayor, Jane M. Byrne, takes office.
 Woodstock Institute headquartered in city.
 1981: Hill Street Blues television show premieres on January 15. 
 1983
 Harold Washington became the first African American mayor.
 Ordinance banning handguns takes effect.
 1984
 The Chicago Cubs reach the postseason for the first time since 1945
 The Nike shoe Air Jordan is made for superstar basketball player of the Chicago Bulls Michael Jordan.
 Heartland Institute headquartered in city.
 1986
 Oprah Winfrey's Harpo Productions, Inc. in business.
 The Chicago Bears win Super Bowl XX
 Presidential Towers complex completed
 1988
 Lights are installed in Wrigley Field
 Christian Peacemaker Teams headquartered in city.
 1990: Population: 2,783,726.
 1992: April 13, the Chicago Flood.
 1995
 The Chicago Heat Wave of 1995.
 Your Radio Playhouse begins broadcasting.
 Kroch's and Brentano's, once the largest privately owned bookstore chain in the US, closes.
1996
 Chicago hosts the 1996 Democratic National Convention, sparking protests such as the one whereby Civil Rights Movement historian Randy Kryn and 10 others were arrested by the Federal Protective Service.
 City website online (approximate date).
 1998: The Chicago Bulls won their sixth NBA championship in eight years.

21st century
 2001: 
 Chicago International Speedway is opened.
 Boeing moves its headquarters from Seattle to Chicago
 2002: Lakeview Polar Bear Club founded (now known as the Chicago Polar Bear Club).
 2003
 Meigs Field closed after having large X-shaped gouges dug into the runway surface by bulldozers in the middle of the night.
 Chicago Film Archives founded.
 February 17: 2003 E2 nightclub stampede
 June 29: 2003 Chicago balcony collapse
 2004: Millennium Park opens.
 2005
 The Chicago White Sox win their first World Series in 88 years.
 Regional Chicago Metropolitan Agency for Planning established.
 2006
 May 1, the 2006 U.S. immigration reform protests draw over 400,000.
 Cloud Gate artwork installed in Millennium Park.
 2008: November 4, US President-elect Barack Obama makes his victory speech in Grant Park.

 2010
 June 28: US supreme court case McDonald v. City of Chicago decided; overturns city handgun ban.
 Chicago Blackhawks win the Stanley Cup.
 City of Chicago Data Portal launched.
 2011
 February 2: 900 cars abandoned on Lake Shore Drive due to Blizzard.
 March 30: Last of Cabrini Green towers torn down.
 Rahm Emanuel becomes mayor.
 Population: 8,707,120; metro 17,504,753.
 2012
38th G8 summit and 2012 Chicago Summit are to take place in Chicago.
 The first of an ongoing franchise of NBC Chicago-set dramas, Chicago Fire, makes its world premiere on WMAQ
 2013
 Chicago Blackhawks win the Stanley Cup scoring 2 goals in 17 seconds to defeat the Boston Bruins
 Robin Kelly becomes U.S. representative for Illinois's 2nd congressional district.
 2014: 
 January: Chiberia 
 August: Archer Daniels Midland completes its headquarters move from Decatur to the Loop.
 November 2: Wallenda performs high-wire stunt.
 2015
 606 linear park opens.
 Chicago Blackhawks win the Stanley Cup yet again for the third time in six years, establishing a "puck dynasty" nationwide and arguably becoming the best team in the NHL.
Video of the murder of Laquan McDonald is released by court order, and protests ensue.
 2016: 
 June 16: McDonald's announces it will move its headquarters from Oak Brook to the West Loop by 2018.
 ConAgra completes its headquarters move from Omaha to the Merchandise Mart.
 November 2: Cubs win the world series. 

 2017
 January 21: Women's protest against U.S. president Trump.
 City approves public high school "post-graduation plan" graduation requirement (to be effected 2020).
 2018: Walgreens announces the move of its headquarters from Deerfield, including 2,000 jobs,  to the Old Chicago Main Post Office.
 2019

May 20: Lori Lightfoot becomes the first female African-American mayor of Chicago.
 2020
March 16: First Chicago death due to the COVID-19 pandemic; Governor J.B. Pritzker and Mayor Lori Lightfoot issue a stay at home order.

See also
 History of Chicago
 List of mayors of Chicago
 National Register of Historic Places listings in Chicago
 Timeline of Illinois.

References

Further reading

External links

 
  (Sortable by decade)

Chicago-related lists
History of Chicago
Chicago
Years in Illinois